John Conrad Bucher (December 28, 1792October 15, 1851) was a Jacksonian member of the U.S. House of Representatives from Pennsylvania.

He was born in Harrisburg, Pennsylvania, the son of John Jacob Bucher (1764–1827) and Susanna Margaret Horter (1774–1838). His father represented Dauphin county in the Pennsylvania Legislature, sitting at Lancaster, nine successive terms from 1803, and was later appointed by Governor Findlay an associate judge for the county of Dauphin.

He studied law, and was admitted to the bar and commenced practice in Harrisburg. He served as clerk of the land department of Pennsylvania in 1813.  He was a member of the borough council of Harrisburg and a member of the board of school directors.

Bucher was elected as a Jacksonian to the Twenty-second Congress.  He served as a trustee of Harrisburg Academy, Franklin College in Lancaster, Pennsylvania, and Marshall College in Mercersburg, Pennsylvania. He became an associate judge of Dauphin County, Pennsylvania, by appointment of Governor David R. Porter from 1839 until his death in Harrisburg, in 1851.  He was buried at Harrisburg Cemetery, of which he was one of the founders.

In 1820, he married Ellen Isett (1797–1881). They had five children: Maria-Elizabeth, John-Conrad, Susan, Ellen, and Eliza-Isett.

Sources

External links

Family History of John Conrad Bucher on SearchTrees.com
The Political Graveyard

1792 births
1851 deaths
Burials at Harrisburg Cemetery
Pennsylvania lawyers
Politicians from Harrisburg, Pennsylvania
Pennsylvania state court judges
Jacksonian members of the United States House of Representatives from Pennsylvania
19th-century American politicians